Recuerda is a compilation album by Dazzling Killmen, released on July 9, 1996 through Skin Graft Records.

Track listing

Personnel 
Dazzling Killmen
Blake Fleming – drums
Tim Garrigan – guitar
Darin Gray – bass guitar
Nick Sakes – guitar, vocals
Production and additional personnel
Steve Albini – production
Dennis Carter – saxophone on "Ghost Limb"
Cub Scout Troop 56389 – vocals on "******"
Jack Petracek – production
Casey Rice – mixing
David Wm. Sims – engineering
Jeff Tweedy – production, guitar on "Killing Fever"

References 

1996 compilation albums
Albums produced by Steve Albini
Albums produced by Jeff Tweedy
Dazzling Killmen albums
Skin Graft Records compilation albums